Clara Howard was the second-to-last novel published by Charles Brockden Brown. First published in 1801, the novel is both an epistolary novel and a novel of manners which diverges, alongside the novel Jane Talbot from earlier novels by Brown which were more intense and radical Gothic fiction.

Critic Paul Worthington calls these novels a natural progression of Brown's quest for a perfect novel form, despite their divergence in themes. While other critics where extremely negative about this change.

Form and genre 
The novel, as an epistolary novel, largely includes letters between Clara and her lover Philip. Critic Marin Samual Vilas, writing in 1904, noted that the epistolary form creates the greatest weaknesses of the novel.

Themes 
The novel focuses on how Clara's individuality becomes subsumed by social norms and expectations. In this context, "Love, like any other concern, must submit to reason", and even reason.

Reception 
Writing in 1904, critic and biographer Martin Samual Vilas called the novel "exceedly simple", full of "sickly sentamentalism", and evidence that "Experience in works of fiction did not add to Brown's ability in writing them."

References

Further reading 

1801 American novels
Epistolary novels
Novels by Charles Brockden Brown